Tricholoma panicolor is an agaric fungus of the genus Tricholoma. Found in the South Solomons, it was described as new to science in 1994 by English mycologist E.J.H. Corner.

See also
List of Tricholoma species

References

panicolor
Fungi described in 1994
Fungi of Oceania
Taxa named by E. J. H. Corner
Fungi without expected TNC conservation status